Mallerey is a former commune in the Jura department in Bourgogne-Franche-Comté in eastern France. On 1 January 2017, it was merged into the commune Trenal.

Population

See also
Communes of the Jura department

References

Former communes of Jura (department)